Aeolia or Eolia may refer to:

Aeolia daughter of Amythaon and wife of Calydon
Aeolia (mythical island), the mythical floating island (nesos Aiolios) visited by Odysseus in Homer's Odyssey
Aeolis or Aeolia in Anatolia
Thessaly or Aeolia
Aeolia (Mother 3), a character in the 2006 Japanese role-playing video game Mother 3
Aeolia Schenberg, a character in the 2007-2009 Japanese anime television series Mobile Suit Gundam 00
Aeolia (album), a 2006 album by Leprous
Eolia 25, a French sailboat design
Eolia-Harkness Estate, the former name of the Harkness Memorial State Park in Waterford, Connecticut, United States
Eolia, Missouri, a village in Pike County, Missouri, United States
Eolia, Kentucky, an unincorporated community in Letcher County, Kentucky, United States
Leo Aiolia, a major character in Saint Seiya.

See also
 Aeolian (disambiguation)